Psychodermatology is the treatment of skin disorders using psychological and psychiatric techniques by addressing the interaction between mind and skin. Though historically there has not been strong scientific support for its practice, there is increasing evidence that behavioral treatments may be effective in the management of chronic skin disorders.

The practice of psychodermatology is based on the complex interplay between neurological, immunological, cutaneous and endocrine systems, known alternatively as the NICE network, NICS, and by other similar acronyms. The interaction between nervous system, skin, and immunity has been explained by release of mediators from network. In the course of several inflammatory skin diseases and psychiatric conditions, the neuroendocrine-immune-cutaneous network is destabilized.

Concept
The disorders that proponents classify as psychodermatologic fall into three general categories: psychophysiologic disorders, primary psychiatric disorders and secondary psychiatric disorders. Proponents frequently claim treatment for psoriasis, eczema, hives, genital and oral herpes, acne, warts, skin allergies, pain, burning sensations, and hair loss. Psychodermatological treatment techniques include psychotherapy, meditation, relaxation, hypnosis, acupuncture, yoga, tai chi, and anti-anxiety drugs.

Psychophysiologic disorders are conditions that are precipitated by or worsened by experiencing stressful emotions. These conditions are not always related to stress and in many cases respond to medication but stress can be a contributing factor in some cases.

Controversy
In a 2013 paper published in the Clinics in Dermatology, the official journal of the International Academy of Cosmetic Dermatology, the facts and controversies of this topic were examined with the conclusion:
Although clinical experience is often in concordance with this notion, apparently scientific proof can sometimes be challenging rather than straight forward. Although many data have been published, it appears that not enough good statistical evidence exists to support them. The difficulty in validating beyond a doubt the stress-skin interactions has rendered some skepticism among physicians.

Harriet Hall notes that the specialty may not be needed at all because medicine already takes a holistic approach to treating a patient. A 2007 review of the literature generated from 1951 to 2004 finds that most dermatologists and psychologists recommend a synthesis of treatment rather than seeing another specialist.

See also
British Association of Dermatologists
Hypnodermatology
List of cutaneous conditions
Pseudoscience

External links 
Association for Psychoneurocutaneous Medicine of North America (APMNA)

References 

Dermatology